The 1898 Central Michigan Normalites football team represented Central Michigan Normal School, later renamed Central Michigan University, as an independent during the 1898 college football season.  Under head coach Carl Pray, the Normalites compiled a 1–2 record, but outscored their opponents by a total of 37 to 32.

Schedule

References

Central Michigan
Central Michigan Chippewas football seasons
Central Michigan Normalites football